Reinmar of Bielau called Reynevan, is a fictional character and the protagonist of the Hussite Trilogy series of novels by Polish writer Andrzej Sapkowski. It consists of three books, The Tower of Fools, Warriors of God and Light Perpetual.

Fictional biography 
Reynevan came from Bielawa. His father died during the Battle of Grunwald on 15 July 1410. He was fighting for the Teutonic Order. His mother's name was Boguszka. His grandfather was the illegitimate son of Margareta, daughter of Duke Henry VI the Good. His brother , Peterlin, owned a dyeing company in Powojowice. Reynevan could speak German, Polish and Czech languages. Of nationality, he defines himself as a Silesian. He studied medicine and wizardry in Prague, where he met Bolko V the Hussite, who later became the Duke of Głogówek and Prudnik.

The Tower of Fools 
Reynevan's first appearance was in The Tower of Fools. Its action starts in 1425, when brothers Stercza found him in bed with Adela von Stercza, wife of Gelfrad von Stercza. During his escape, one of the brothers died. After that, the brothers wanted to get their revenge on Reynevan, so they hired thugs to kidnap him. Reinmar decided to escape to his brother Peterlin. On his way to Powojowice, he met Zawisza Czarny, who told him that he will not die in a natural way, which was a reference to his interests: woman, wizardry, medicine and alchemy. After arriving in Powojowice, Reynevan got informed that Peterlin was murdered. He suspected that he was killed by the thugs hired by brothers Stercza.

Reynevan decided to avenge his brother. He also wanted to make his way to Ziębice, where Adela was held as a prisoner. During his journey, he got rescued by a mysterious woman called Nikoletta. After that, he met a priest Szarlej, who decided to help him in his quest. Reynevan and Szarlej arrived at a monastery, where they performed exorcisms and met Samson Miodek. When three of them arrived at Ziębice, they got informed that Adela doesn't love Reynevan anymore and is now in a relationship with Duke John I of Münsterberg.

During the novel, Reynevan travelled through cities on the eastern part of Lower Silesia, ex. Oleśnica, Oława, Paczków, Kłodzko and Świdnica.

Warriors of God 
Warriors of God take place in 1427, two years after the events of The Tower of Fools. Reynevan, Szarlej and Samson Miodek were residing in Prague, which at the time was dominated by the Hussites that were calling themselves "the warriors of God". They received secret orders from Prokop the Great. They contacted with local wizards to disenchant Samson. They went on a journey to Trosky Castle in search of the wizard called Rupiliusa. During their way, Reynevan was kidnapped and prisoned in a dungeon, in which he was contacted by the ghost of Rupiliusa. After his escape, he was taken prisoner by Birkart von Grellenort. He managed to escape thanks to Samson's help. Reynevan, Samson and Szarlej went to Silesia to carry out Prokop's orders on getting in contact with Hussite spies.

Warriors of God takes place in the vicinity of Prague and in the southern Silesia, ex. Jelenia Góra, Nysa, Głuchołazy, Prudnik, Kazimierz.

Ceaseless Light 
Ceaseless Light starts in the beginning of 1429, when Reynevan was searching for Nikoletta, who was imprisoned by the Papal Inquisition. He goes to Wrocław, where he threatens a priest called Felicjan with hope that he'll tell him where Nikoletta is being prisoned. In the meantime, he got excommunicated by bishop Konrad for working with the Hussites and for killing John I of Münsterberg. Reynevan was kidnapped by the warriors of Urban Horn on their way to Prague. He was rescued by Szarlej and Samson. He was also helped by a young Jewish woman called Rixa Cartafila de Fonseca, who was a spy for King Władysław II Jagiełło.

Reynevan managed to rescue Nikoletta, but her health was fatal. Reynevan's medical skills weren't enough to save her from dying. After that, Reynevan along with Szarlej and Samson joint the Hussite army. He later met with a group of his old friends in Poland, while they were planning to attack the Jasna Góra Monastery. Although Reynevan saved the icon of Black Madonna of Częstochowa, he was thrown to prison, in which he stayed until 1434.

Characteristic 
Reinmar is considerably different from Geralt of Rivia, Sapkowski's most popular character – unlike his predecessor he is very naïve and often, through his own stupidity, gets himself into trouble.

In Polish audiobooks of the Hussite Trilogy, his voice actor is Lesław Żurek.

References 

Fictional alchemists
Fictional physicians
Fictional members of secret societies
Fictional nobility
Fictional pharmacists
Male characters in literature
Hussite Trilogy
Fictional Polish people